Clifton Davies (12 December 1919 – 28 January 1967) was a Welsh international prop who played club rugby for Cardiff and invitational rugby for the Barbarians. He won 16 caps for Wales and was selected to play in the British Lions on the 1950 tour of Australia and New Zealand.

Davies was a short, tough prop forward, who was also known within rugby circles for his cheery demeanor and baritone singing voice.

Rugby career
Davies began his rugby career with local club Kenfig Hill before moving to Bridgend. After the war, Davies was persuaded to join first tier club, Cardiff, by Jack Matthews and joined the Blues in the 1945/46 season. Davies made his international debut for Wales during the 1947 Five Nations Championship, when he was selected to face Scotland at Murrayfield. Under the captaincy of Haydn Tanner, Wales beat the Scottish team convincingly and Davies secured his position in the team for the rest of the season. In his second game for Wales, Davies was involved in a memorable match against France at Stade Colombes. In a bruising encounter, Davies bit the ear of French prop Jean Princlary in the scrum, after the Frenchman's continual harassment of Billy Gore, the Welsh hooker. The Welsh team were happy to win the game by a single drop goal.

During the 1947/48 season, Davies was part of one of the strongest Cardiff teams in the club's history. Out of 41 games, Cardiff lost just two, to Pontypool and Penarth, and also beat the touring Australians. Davies was also picked to face the Australians for Wales, which saw the Welsh team win through two penalty goals from Bill Tamplin. Davies played for all four matches of the 1948 Five Nations Championship, though after a draw against England and a win over Scotland, Davies experienced his first international loss when Wales were beaten by both France and Ireland. The 1949 season was a poor one for Davies, as he was picked for only one game of the tournament in another loss to the French.

1950 was a far better year for Davies, which cemented his position as one of the truly great Welsh props. Davies played in all four of the 1950 Championship which saw Wales win their first Grand Slam since 1911. The Welsh pack included two inexperienced players, David Davies and John Robins, and it was Cliff who steadied the Welsh pack, allowing his hooker to win key possession in the scrums. In the opening game against England, Davies also scored his only international points, finishing off a Lewis John run to score a try at Twickenham to give Wales the victory. That year he was chosen for the British Lions tour of Australia and New Zealand, and although playing in only one test, he was a popular character who kept up team morale.

Davies' played in the first three opening games of the 1951 Championship, but was dropped after a draw against Ireland at the Cardiff Arms Park. Davies then faced his final major touring team, when he was part of the Cardiff team that faced the touring South Africa team. It was a close match which Cardiff lost 11–9. Davies played particularly well in the front row, but when he turned up from working down the mine he was unshaven and used his stubble against the South African prop, Jaap Bekker in the scrum. After rubbing the side of Bekker's face raw, Bekker warned Davies to stop, or he would bite him. Davies did not stop, and Bekker responded by biting a piece out of Davies' ear which caused a heavy bleed.

Davies retired from first class rugby in 1952.

International matches played
Wales
  1947
  1948, 1950, 1951
  1947, 1948, 1949, 1950
  1947, 1948, 1950, 1951
  1947, 1948, 1950, 1951

British Lions
  1950 (4th Test)

References

Bibliography
 
 
 

1919 births
1967 deaths
Barbarian F.C. players
British & Irish Lions rugby union players from Wales
Cardiff RFC players
Kenfig Hill RFC players
Rugby union players from Kenfig Hill
Rugby union props
Welsh miners
Welsh rugby union players